The Gauliga Wartheland was the highest football league in Gau Wartheland from 1941 to 1945. The Gau was made up from the former Polish Voivodeship of Poznań and parts of Warsaw Voivodeship and Łódź Voivodeship which had been occupied by Nazi Germany in 1939 and incorporated into the Third Reich. The league and the region are named after the local river Warthe (Polish:Warta), and not after the Prussian province Posen, which it had been from 1848 to 1918.

Overview
The league was introduced by the Nazi Sports Office in 1941, a considerable time after the defeat of Poland. The league started out in two groups of five teams, with the two divisional champions playing each other in a home-and-away series to determine the Gauliga champion. The league champion then qualified for the German championship. Polish clubs were not permitted to take part in the competition, only clubs from the German ethnic minority, which made up between five and ten percent of the population in the region and about two percent of the overall population of Poland.

In its second season, the league played with ten teams in a single division. The bottom three teams were relegated at the end of the season. The 1943-44 edition initially saw no change, but the SG Freihaus dropped out of the league during the season and not all games were played throughout the season.

The imminent collapse of Nazi Germany in 1945 affected play throughout the country with Gauliga competition in this region coming to a halt in 1944. There is no record that the 1944-45 season here ever commenced.

Founding members of the league
The ten founding members were:

Group I:
 Deutscher SC Posen
 BSG DWM Posen
 SG Ordnungspolizei Posen
 Reichsbahn SG Posen
 Post SG Posen

Group II:
 SG Ordnungspolizei Litzmannstadt
 Union 97 Litzmannstadt
 SG Zduńska Wola (1943 SG Freihaus)
 Reichsbahn SG Litzmannstadt
 SG Sturm Pabianitz

Litzmannstadt was the German name for Łódź from 1939 to 1945, named after Karl Litzmann.

Winners and runners-up of the league
The winners and runners-up of the league:

Placings in the league 1941-44
The complete list of clubs in the league:

Aftermath
With the end of the Nazi era, the Gauligas ceased to exist. The Wartheland came under Soviet control before again becoming part of Poland again. The German population was almost completely expelled from the region and all German football clubs were dissolved.

References

Sources
 Die deutschen Gauligen 1933-45 - Heft 1-3  Tables of the Gauligas 1933-45, publisher: DSFS
 Kicker Almanach,  The yearbook on German football from Bundesliga to Oberliga, since 1937, published by the Kicker Sports Magazine

External links
  The Gauligas Das Deutsche Fussball Archiv 
 Germany - Championships 1902-1945 at RSSSF.com
 Where's My Country? Article on cross-border movements of football clubs, at RSSSF.com

Sports leagues established in 1941
1945 disestablishments in Poland
Gauliga
Defunct football competitions in Poland
1940 in Polish football
1941 in Polish football
1942 in Polish football
1943 in Polish football
1944 in Polish football
war